John Golightly (born 18 May 1936 in Reslven, Glamorgan) is a Welsh actor who has appeared in numerous British television productions over a 45-year period.
 
His father was a transport foreman. After grammar school he trained as an actor at RADA and appeared in repertory theatres in England.

His television appearances include Colditz, UFO episode "Sub-Smash", Sapphire & Steel, Lovejoy, Inspector Morse, Softly, Softly and Angels. 
Films include The Heroes of Telemark (1965), Laughter in the Dark (1969) and Nineteen Eighty-Four (1984). He has also appeared on Broadway.

Filmography

References

External links

1936 births
Living people
Welsh male film actors
Welsh male stage actors
Welsh male television actors
Alumni of RADA
People from Neath Port Talbot